Alcatraz: The Whole Shocking Story is a 1980 American miniseries about Clarence Carnes, the youngest ever inmate of Alcatraz Prison. It screened over two nights, from Monday, July 10 to Tuesday, July 11 on NBC. It was written and co-produced by Ernest Tidyman.

Plot
Part one details the early life and imprisonment of Clarence Carnes, climaxing with the Battle of Alcatraz. Part two focuses on Carnes as a veteran prisoner, his friendship with Robert Stroud, and his involvement in the escape attempt of Frank Morris and the Anglin brothers.

Cast
 Michael Beck as Clarence Carnes
 Art Carney as Robert Stroud
 Alex Karras as E.J. "Jughead" Miller
 Telly Savalas as Joseph Paul Cretzer
 Will Sampson as Clarence's Father
 Ronny Cox as Bernard Coy
 Richard Lynch as Sam Shockley
 Robert Davi as Hubbard
 John Amos as Ellsworth "Bumpy" Johnson
 James MacArthur as Walt Stomer
 Ed Lauter as Frank Morris
 Joe Pantoliano as Ray Neal
 Louis Giambalvo as Clarence Anglin
 Antony Ponzini as John Anglin
 Jeffrey Tambor as Dankworth
 Paul Mantee as Ordway

Production
The production was partly shot on location in Alcatraz.

Reception
The Los Angeles Times called it "the prison story to end all prison stories".

The New York Times was harsher saying "ordinarily foolproof material is presented at such length that dramatic tension drains away... Mr. Beck is adequate...  Mr. Savalas is almost the only member of the large cast who looks even a little like the sort of case-hardened criminals that used to end up at Alcatraz. The others look like tourists who caught the wrong ferry at Fisherman's Wharf... the writing... and the direction... are dedicated more to simplicity and economy than to drama."

References

External links

1980 American television series debuts
1980s American television miniseries
English-language television shows